This is a list of diplomatic missions in East Timor (officially, Timor-Leste).  The capital Dili hosts 16 embassies, mostly from neighboring and regional states (not including honorary consulates).

Diplomatic missions in Dili

Embassies

Other missions 
 (Delegation)

Consulates

Pante Macassar

Accredited non-resident embassies 
Resident in Beijing, China:

 

Resident in Canberra, Australia

 

Resident in Jakarta, Indonesia

 

 

 

 

 

    

Resident in Kuala Lumpur, Malaysia:

 
 

Resident in Tokyo, Japan:

  

 

Resident in New Delhi, India:

 

Resident in Singapore:

Closed missions

See also 
Foreign relations of East Timor
List of diplomatic missions of East Timor

Notes

References 

Foreign relations of East Timor
Diplomatic missions
East Timor